Alexander Murray (ca. 1715 – 1762) was a British army officer who served in Father Le Loutre's War and the French and Indian War in Nova Scotia. He was the cousin of James Murray.

See also 
Military history of Nova Scotia

Links 
Portrait of Murray as a child

References 

 
 "The Letters of Colonel Alexander Murray 1742–1759". Nottinghamshire and Derbyshire Regiment: regimental annual 1938: Volumes 1921–1926; pp. 181–220.
 "Letters of Colonel Alexander Murray," Sherwood Foresters Regimental Annual, 1926 (London, 1927), 181–220; 1927 (London, 1928), 240–68.

Military history of Acadia
Military history of Nova Scotia
Military history of Canada
1710s births
1762 deaths
British Army generals
British Army personnel of the War of the Austrian Succession
British Army personnel of the Jacobite rising of 1745
British Army personnel of the Seven Years' War
Persons of National Historic Significance (Canada)